Crashing Through is a 1928 American silent Western film directed by Tom Buckingham and starring Jack Padjan, Sally Rand, and Tom Santschi.

Cast
 Jack Padjan as Tex Belden 
 Sally Rand as Rita Bayne 
 William Eugene as Jim Bayne 
 Buster Gardner as Slim 
 Tom Santschi as Bart Ramy 
 Duke R. Lee as Sheriff

References

External links
 

1928 films
1928 Western (genre) films
Films directed by Tom Buckingham
American black-and-white films
Pathé Exchange films
Silent American Western (genre) films
1920s English-language films
1920s American films